William Rhodes (birth unknown – death unknown) was an English professional rugby league footballer who played in the 1910s and 1920s, and coached in the 1920s through to the 1950s.

Playing career

International honours
Billy Rhodes won caps for England while at Dewsbury in 1921 against Wales, and Other Nationalities.

Challenge Cup Final appearances
Billy Rhodes played , i.e. number 2, and scored two tries in Dewsbury's 8-5 victory over Oldham in the 1911–12 Challenge Cup Final during the 1911-12 season at Headingley Rugby Stadium, Leeds on Saturday 27 April 1912 in front of a crowd of 16,000, and played right-, i.e. number 10, in the 2-13 defeat by Wigan in the 1928–29 Challenge Cup Final during the 1928–29 season at Wembley Stadium, London on Saturday 4 May 1929, in front of a crowd of 41,500.

Coaching career

Challenge Cup Final appearances
Billy Rhodes was the coach in Castleford's 11-8 victory over Huddersfield in the 1934–35 Challenge Cup Final during the 1934–35 season at Wembley Stadium, London on Saturday 4 May 1935, in front of a crowd of 39,000.

Club career
Billy Rhodes was the coach of Castleford on four occasions; 1926–27 season to 1928, 1932 to 1951, 1952 to November 1953, and December 1957 to 1958, his first game in charge was on Saturday 28 August 1926, and his last game in charge was on Wednesday 23 April 1958.

References

External links
Ray French selects his top 10 Challenge Cup final shocks. No 6: 1912, Dewsbury 8-5 Oldham

Castleford Tigers coaches
Dewsbury Rams players
England national rugby league team players
English rugby league coaches
English rugby league players
Place of birth missing
Place of death missing
Rugby league props
Rugby league wingers
Year of birth missing
Year of death missing